A wood waste burner, known as a teepee burner or wigwam burner in the United States and a beehive burner in Canada, is a free-standing conical steel structure usually ranging from 30 to 60 feet in height. They are named for their resemblance to beehives, teepees or wigwams. A sawdust burner is cylindrical. They have an opening at the top that is covered with a steel grill or mesh to keep sparks and glowing embers from escaping.  Sawdust and wood scraps are delivered to an opening near the top of the cone by means of a conveyor belt or Archimedes' screw, where they fall onto the fire near the center of the structure.

Teepee or beehive burners are used to dispose of waste wood in logging yards and sawdust from sawmills by incineration. As a result, they produce a large quantity of smoke and ash, which is vented directly into the atmosphere without filtering, contributing to poor air quality. The burners are considered to be a major source of air pollution and have been phased out in most areas. There are a few beehive burners remaining in Western Canada.

Teepee burners went out of general use in the Northwestern United States in the early 1970s, and are prohibited from operation in Oregon, as well as southwestern Washington State. The wood waste is now used as a component in various forest products, such as pellet fuel, particle board and mulch.

Gallery

See also
 Air pollution in British Columbia
 Clean Air Act of 1970

References

External links
 
 Historic images of teepee burners in Oregon from the Salem, Oregon, Public Library
 Rusty Relics: Teepee Burners

Environmental issues in Canada
History of the Pacific Northwest
Incineration
Logging